Bon may refer to:

Bushehr Province
 Bon Bid, a village in Dashti County

Hormozgan Province
 Bon Gahar, a village in Hajjiabad County
 Bon-e Garekh, a village in Bashagard County
 Bon Kuh, a village in Bandar Lengeh County

Ilam Province
 Bon Baba Jan, a village in Darreh Shahr County
 Bon Vaz, a village in Ilam County

Isfahan Province
 Bon Rud District, an administrative subdivision of Isfahan County

Kerman Province
 Bon-e Derriz, a village in Anbarabad County
 Bon-e Gelu, a village in Anbarabad County
 Bon-e Navizan, a village in Anbarabad County

Khuzestan Province
 Bon Ajam, a village in Haftgel County
 Bon-e Dab, a village in Lali County
 Bon Honi, a village in Andimeshk County
 Bon Konar, a village in Izeh County
 Bon Rashid, a village in Ramhormoz County
 Bon Shovar, a village in Bagh-e Malek County

Lorestan Province
 Bon Abbas, a village in Pol-e Dokhtar County
 Bon Abbas Gol Bag Mir, a village in Pol-e Dokhtar County
 Bon Karreh-ye Kohzadvand, a village in Pol-e Dokhtar County
 Bon Keshkeh, a village in Pol-e Dokhtar County
 Bon Lar, a village in Pol-e Dokhtar County
 Bon Mazraeh, a village in Dowreh County
 Bon Pahneh, a village in Pol-e Dokhtar County
 Bon Tang, a village in Aligudarz County
 Bon Tuman 1, a village in Pol-e Dokhtar County
 Bon Tuman 2, a village in Pol-e Dokhtar County
 Bon Tuman 3, a village in Pol-e Dokhtar County
 Bon Vizeh, a village in Borujerd County

Markazi Province
 Bon Chenar, a village in Ashtian County
 Bon-e Gonbad, a village in Shazand County

Qazvin Province
 Bon Zohreh, a village in Qazvin County

Razavi Khorasan
 Bon Jakh, a village in Sabzevar County

Semnan Province
 Bon-e Kuh, Semnan, a village in Garmsar County

South Khorasan Province
 Bon Khunik, a village in Qaen County